Brother's Keeper is a genealogy software program for Windows.

The program functions as a database, a research planner and task organizer, a data analyzer, a chart producer, and a report writer. The software enables export and import in the GEDCOM specification for exchanging genealogical data.

Brother's Keeper used Btrieve as the underlying database engine before version 7.

Brother's Keeper has an email list for user support.

Languages
Brother's Keeper is available in the following languages: English,
Norwegian, French (Canadian), French (Belgium), 
German, Danish, Icelandic and Czech, Dutch, Dutch (Belgium), Estonian, Slovenian, Slovak, Swedish, Finnish, Russian, Polish, Catalan, Portuguese, and Afrikaans.

References

External links

Brother's Keeper DOS Version 5.2B
Brother's Keeper Windows Version 5.2G
Brother's Keeper Windows Version 6.6
Brother's Keeper Windows Version 7
Brother's Keeper Forum on genealogy.com

Windows-only shareware
Windows-only genealogy software